Carheil Lake is a lake in the Côte-Nord region of Quebec, Canada. It  is just south of Fermont, and is the source of the Carheil River, which runs south to the Aux Pékans River. The lake has been polluted with phosphorus from wastewater effluent from Fermont, causing algal bloom. This is cause for concern since the lake is among the headwaters for the wild and unspoiled Moisie River.

Location

Carheil Lake is south of Fermont and of Quebec Route 389.
It is in the Caniapiscau Regional County Municipality near the western boundary of Labrador.
Carheil Lake's elongated shape and orientation indicate a glacial origin.

Name

The lake's name was made official on 5 December 1968.
The Commission de toponymie du Québec does not have information about its origin.
The commission states that the canton of Carheil, far to the west, is named after the Jesuit missionary Étienne de Carheil (1633-1726).
Possibly there is a connection.

Drainage basin

It is in an area of rounded hills and flat areas with peat bogs, wetlands and many lakes and small streams.
The valleys show the influence of glacial action and contain undifferentiated glacial till and fluvioglacial deposits of sand and gravel.

Lac Daviault is to the north of the lake, lying to the east and south of the town of Fermont, and draining via Lac Sans Nom into Carheil Lake.
Lac de la Rue feeds through Lac Cladonie and Lac Low Ball into the northwest of the lake.
Lac Jonquet is to the east of the lake.
Lac Moiré to the northeast also drains into the lake, as do other small lakes such as Lac Tupper, Lac Perchard and Lac en Croissant.
The Carheil River leaves Carheil Lake from the southeast.
The river is a tributary of the Aux  Pékans River, in turn a tributary of the Moisie River.

Environment

There are scattered areas of permafrost.
A map of the Ecological regions of Quebec shows the Carheil Lake rising to the south of Fermont just west of the Spruce/lichen domain of the boreal zone.
It is in the eastern spruce/moss domain of the boreal zone.

The Carheil watershed is characterized by coniferous trees that are tolerant of prolonged contact with water. 
Even in the undergrowth, shrubs and herbaceous species are all tolerant of extreme moisture conditions, such as  willow shrubs, heathers, bog-myrtle and grey alder.
Black spruce stands replace the fir-white birch found at lower latitudes. 
Several broad leaved and coniferous tree species coexist with black spruce, such as yellow birch, trembling aspen, balsam poplar, balsam fir and tamarack. The undergrowth is mainly carpets of moss and ericaceous species.
As of 2015 the lake's shoreline appeared to be in excellent natural condition.

Human presence

The surroundings of the lake include cottages and forest shelters.
An existing road leads south from Fermont to the lake.
A report issued in 2016 on improving Quebec Route 389 between Fire Lake and Fermont proposed as one option to leave the present Route 389 between km 507 and 566, branch northeast and cross the Pekans River and La Rue Lake, then run along the existing road along Carheil Lake and up to the present Route 389.
Construction of the road would involve deforestation at the crossing of the Pékans River and De La Rue Lake, and along the northwest shore of Carheil Lake.
In September 2012 two men drowned in the lake when their canoe overturned. Neither was wearing a life jacket.
A new  quad (all-terrain vehicle) trail was built in 2015 from Fermont to the lake by the Club VTT du Grand Nord.

In 2017 Metals Australia announced initial exploration results at their  Lac Rainy Est graphite project, important in providing an input to lithium-ion battery manufacturing.
The Carheil Lake deposit is on the west shore of the south part of the lake.

Pollution

The lake is classified a Lake of Concern by Quebec's Ministère de l'Environnement et de la Lutte contre les changements climatiques.
In April 2011 it was reported that water management experts in Sept-Îles were concerned about cyanobacteria, or blue-green algae, that had been found in Carheil Lake.
The cause of excessive phosphorus in the lake was discharge from the Fermont treatment plant over a period of forty years.
The plant had recently been modernized, reducing the phosphorus released by 80% to 90%.
The lake is a tributary to the large wild river, the Moisie River.
There was a lack of funding for a $150,000 study of the impact on the Moisie River. 

The Ministry of Sustainable Development, Environment and Parks (MDDEP) told the OBV Duplessis to evaluate the situation of Carheil Lake, resulting in publication of a study in November 2011. 
The report noted that Lakes Daviault and Sans-Nom had also been affected with cyanobacterial efflorescence every year since 2005, and the Fermont treatment plant was the only known source of phosphorus.
Until 2010 wastewater from Fermont was treated only by removal of solids.
Although less phosphorus is being added to the lakes, phosphorus tends to accumulate rather than flow away, so the lakes could continue to experience cyanobacterial efflorescence from existing phosphorus.

The researchers found that little was known about flow rates, renewal times, levels of oxygen, phosphorus and nitrogen, stratification, phytoplankton and fish populations in Carheil Lake or the other lakes.
To fill the gap, OBV Duplessis was conducting an ecosystem study of the three lakes.
The 2011 report covered hydrodynamic and physicochemical aspects, and a second report on biological aspects was planned for 2012 subject to funding availability.
By comparison, Lake Perchard, to the north of Fermont, supplies the town with drinking water.
A more complete report was issued in April 2015 giving information about the biota.

Notes

Sources

External sources

Lakes of Côte-Nord